Epigaea repens, the mayflower, trailing arbutus, or ground laurel, is a low, spreading shrub in the family Ericaceae. It is found from Newfoundland to Florida, west to Kentucky and the Northwest Territories.

Description
The plant is a slow-growing, prostrate to sprawling shrub that prefers moist, shady habitats and acidic (humus-rich) soil. It is often part of the heath complex in an oak-heath forest.

Its stems are woody and the leafy twigs are covered in rust-colored hairs. The leaves are alternate, ovate (oval-shaped with rounded bases), evergreen, glabrous above and more or less hairy beneath, and borne on short rusty-hairy petioles.

The calyx consists of five dry, overlapping sepals. The corolla is salverform, with a slender hairy tube spreading into five equal lobes. There are 5 stamens. The gynoecium consists of one pistil with a columnar style and a five-lobed stigma.

The genus name Epigaea, meaning "upon the earth", refers to this species' sprawling growth habit.

Symbolism
Epigaea repens is the floral emblem of both Nova Scotia and Massachusetts. Digging up one in Massachusetts is punishable with a $50 fine.

Use among Native Americans
The Algonquin use an infusion of leaves for kidney disorders. The Cherokee use a decoction of the plant to induce vomiting to treat abdominal pain, and they give an infusion of the plant to children for diarrhea. An infusion is also used for the kidneys and for "chest ailment". They also take a compound infusion for indigestion.

The Iroquois use a compound for labor pains in parturition, use a compound decoction for rheumatism, take a decoction of the leaves for indigestion, and they also take a decoction of the whole plant or roots, stalks and leaves taken for the kidneys.

The Forest Potawatomi regard this as their tribal flower and consider it to have come directly from their divinity.

See also
List of U.S. state flowers
List of Canadian provincial and territorial symbols

References

The General Laws of Massachusetts Chapter 2: Section 7. Flower or floral emblem of commonwealth

External links

Dendrology at Virginia Tech: Epigaea repens
Plant UConn Database: Epigaea repens
USDA Plants Profile: Epigaea repens

repens
Flora of North America
Plants described in 1753
Plants used in traditional Native American medicine
Symbols of Massachusetts
Taxa named by Carl Linnaeus
Provincial symbols of Nova Scotia